Aqaj (also Romanized as Āqāj; also known as Āgāch and Āqāch) is a village in Pish Khowr Rural District, Pish Khowr District, Famenin County, Hamadan Province, Iran. In 2006, its population was 286, in 72 families.

References 

Populated places in Famenin County